Chairuddin Siregar (born 7 August 1929) was an Indonesian footballer. He competed in the men's tournament at the 1956 Summer Olympics.

References

External links
 
 

1929 births
Possibly living people
Indonesian footballers
Indonesia international footballers
Olympic footballers of Indonesia
Footballers at the 1956 Summer Olympics
Place of birth missing
Association football defenders
Footballers at the 1951 Asian Games
Asian Games competitors for Indonesia
Persija Jakarta players